Michal Gulaši (born 18 July 1986) is a Czech professional ice hockey player. He currently plays with HC Kometa Brno in the Czech Extraliga (ELH).

Player career
Gulaši played as a youth within HC Vítkovice through to the under 18 and 20 levels before continuing his development in North America, playing major junior with the Lethbridge Hurricanes of the Western Hockey League (WHL).

Undrafted, Gulaši returned to his native Czech Republic with HC Vítkovice, to start his professional career in the Czech Extraliga in the 2005–06 season. 

He later played with HC Sparta Praha from 2008 to 2011, and HC Energie Karlovy Vary from 2011 to 2016, with a season stint in the Swedish HockeyAllsvenskan for Södertälje SK.

Gulaši joined his fourth Extraliga club, HC Kometa Brno for the 2016–17 season.

Career statistics

Regular season and playoffs

International

References

External links

1986 births
Living people
BK Mladá Boleslav players
Czech ice hockey defencemen
HC Kometa Brno players
Lethbridge Hurricanes players
Södertälje SK players
AZ Havířov players
HC Sparta Praha players
HC Vítkovice players
HC Karlovy Vary players
Sportspeople from Ostrava
Czech expatriate ice hockey players in Canada
Czech expatriate ice hockey players in Sweden